The 2015 Indianapolis City–County Council elections took place on November 3, 2015. With all 25 seats up for election, this was the first for the council with newly redrawn districts and without the four at-large seats, which were eliminated by the Republican-controlled Indiana General Assembly in 2013. Before the elections Democrats held a 15–14 seat majority. Primaries for the council were held May 5, 2015, with a handful of races being very close. The closest finish came in district one, with two Democratic incumbents forced into a run-off election because of the redistricting. Leroy Robinson defeated Angela Mansfield by only 26 votes. Following the elections Democrats maintained control of the council with a 13–12 majority. In the Indianapolis mayoral election held at the same time, Democrat Joe Hogsett beat Republican Chuck Brewer. This is only the second time in the history of Indianapolis that Democrats control both the mayor's office and the council.

Results summary

Close races 
Seats where the margin of victory was under 10%:

  gain
 
  gain

Results by district

Notes

References

Indianapolis 
Elections 2015
Indianapolis 2015
Indianapolis City-County Council